Facundo Bagnis was the defending champion.

Facundo Bagnis defended his title by repeating as champion, defeating Rogério Dutra Silva 6–7(3–7), 6–4, 6–3 in the final.

Seeds

Draw

Finals

Top half

Bottom half

References
 Main Draw
 Qualifying Draw

Challenger ATP Cachantun Cup - Singles
2016 - Singles